Ferdinand Pelzer (1801–1860) was a German music teacher, guitarist and composer.

Ferdinand Pelzer was born in Trier. By 1821 he lived in Mülheim, where his daughter Catharina Josepha was born, who became known as the guitarist and composer "Madam Sidney Pratten". With his family, he came to live in England from 1829. With is wife Maria (1804–1863) he had six children, two sons and four daughters. All daughters became muscians, Catharina (1821–1895) and Giulia (1838–1938) playing and teaching guitar, Jane (1831–1846) and Annie (1833–1897) playing piano.

Pelzer travelled and taught widely in England and Ireland. Between 1833 and 1835, he was a co-editor (with Felix Horetzky and Leonhard Schulz) of The Giulianiad, an early guitar journal. He wrote many short compositions and arrangements for solo guitar as well as guitar accompaniments to popular songs.

Although Pelzer's music teaching has been rather neglected, research into contemporary sources suggests that his method to teach singing was better than those of Joseph Mainzer, Bocquillon Wilhem and John Hullah.

He died in London in 1860.

Selected publications
 Instructions for the Spanish Guitar (1833)
 Music for the People, based on his Universal System of Instruction in Music (1842)

References

External links
 

1801 births
1860 deaths
19th-century classical composers
19th-century German musicians
19th-century German male musicians
Burials at Brompton Cemetery
Composers for the classical guitar
German male guitarists
People from Trier
19th-century guitarists